Chionodes permacta is a moth in the family Gelechiidae. It is found in North America, where it has been recorded from western Alaska, southern Yukon and Alberta to Idaho, Wyoming, Montana, Washington, Colorado and southern Oregon.

References

Chionodes
Moths described in 1925
Moths of North America